In solid-state physics, the Hill limit is a critical distance defined in a lattice of actinide or rare-earth atoms. These atoms own partially filled  or  levels in their valence shell and are therefore responsible for the main interaction between each atom and its environment. In this context, the hill limit  is defined as twice the radius of the -orbital. Therefore, if two atoms of the lattice are separate by a distance greater than the Hill limit, the overlap of their -orbital becomes negligible. A direct consequence is the absence of hopping for the f electrons, ie their localization on the ion sites of the lattice.

Localized f electrons lead to paramagnetic materials since the remaining unpaired spins are stuck in their orbitals. However, when the rare-earth lattice (or a single atom) is embedded in a metallic one (intermetallic compound), interactions with the conduction band allow the f electrons to move through the lattice even for interatomic distances above the Hill limit.

See also
 Anderson impurity model

References 

Solid-state chemistry
Rare earth alloys
Electrical conductors